This is the list of episodes for Late Night with Seth Meyers in 2016.

2016

January

February

March

April

May

June

July

August

September

October

November

December

References

External links
 
 Lineups at Interbridge 

Episodes
2016 American television seasons
Lists of American non-fiction television series episodes
Lists of variety television series episodes